Carlos Abaunza (born 15 August 1959) was a Nicaraguan high jumper. He competed in the men's high jump at the 1976 Summer Olympics. Carlos immigrated to the United States when he was 13 years old.

References

External links
 

1959 births
Living people
Athletes (track and field) at the 1976 Summer Olympics
Nicaraguan male high jumpers
Olympic athletes of Nicaragua